The 1988 Villanova Wildcats football team was an American football team that represented the Villanova University as a member of the Yankee Conference during the 1988 NCAA Division I-AA football season. In their fourth year under head coach Andy Talley, the team compiled a 5–5–1 record.

Schedule

References

Villanova
Villanova Wildcats football seasons
Villanova Wildcats football